The 2015–16 Butler Bulldogs women's basketball team represented Butler University in the 2015–16 college basketball season. The Bulldogs, led by second year head coach Kurt Godlevske, are members of the Big East Conference. The Bulldogs played their home games at the Hinkle Fieldhouse. They finished the season 10–21, 4–14 in Big East play to finish in ninth place. They advanced in the quarterfinals of the Big East women's tournament where they lost to DePaul.

Roster

Schedule

|-
!colspan=9 style="background:#13294B; color:#FFFFFF;"| Exhibition

|-
!colspan=9 style="background:#13294B; color:#FFFFFF;"| Non-conference regular season

|-
!colspan=9 style="background:#13294B; color:#FFFFFF;"| Big East Conference Play

|-
!colspan=9 style="background:#13294B; color:#FFFFFF;"| Big East tournament

See also
 2015–16 Butler Bulldogs men's basketball team

References

Butler
Butler Bulldogs women's basketball seasons
Butler Bulldogs women's basketball
Butler Bulldogs women's basketball